Abu Dhar Azzam, also known as Abu Dhar al-Burmi and Abu Dhar al Bakistani, is a Rohingya Islamist cleric and a member of the Islamic Movement of Uzbekistan (IMU).

Biography
Abu Dhar worked in Jamiah Farooqia, Karachi in 2004, before he joined the insurgency movement in Pakistan's tribal areas (FATA). He has been a prominent member of the Turkistan Islamic Party, the Pakistani Taliban and the Islamic Movement of Uzbekistan.
 
He was a former spokesperson for the IMU and a former member of the Islamic State of Iraq and the Levant (ISIL).

Azzam is sympathetic to the Rohingyas and supported them during the 2012 Rakhine State riots. He also congratulated the Tsarnaev brothers for carrying out the Boston Marathon bombing.

See also
 Rohingya conflict

References

External links
 Abu Dhar al-Burmi (Jihadology)

Living people
Rohingya people
Rakhine State
Asian Islamists
Terrorism in Central Asia
Islamic Movement of Uzbekistan
Pakistani people of Rohingya descent
Year of birth missing (living people)